Sean McCarthy (born 12 September 1967) is a Welsh football manager, coach and former professional player who made over 500 appearances in the Football League.

McCarthy played primarily as a striker; however, he was also used in defence.

Career

Playing career
Born in Bridgend, Glamorgan, McCarthy began his career with hometown team Bridgend Town, before moving to Swansea City just a season later. McCarthy also played in the Football League for Plymouth Argyle, Bradford City, Oldham Athletic, Bristol City and Exeter City, scoring 171 goals in 547 appearances.

He is the most recent player to score a top flight goal for Oldham Athletic, scoring for them in a 1–1 FA Premier League draw against Norwich City at Carrow Road on the final day of the 1993–94 season, a game which Oldham's failure to win cost them their top flight status. They have not since regained it.

McCarthy later played non-league football for Taunton Town.

Coaching career
In May 2008, McCarthy was appointed as the new manager of Southern League Division One side Truro City, following the resignation of Dave Leonard. On 7 December 2009, McCarthy left the club by mutual consent following a 7–2 away defeat to Stourbridge.

On 13 January 2011, McCarthy was given a job as a coach at Ipswich Town, by former playing partner Paul Jewell.

On 26 June 2013, McCarthy was appointed first team coach at English Football League Two club Plymouth Argyle On 15 June 2015, he left his position as first team coach at Plymouth Argyle due to a back room staff restructuring.

In July 2016 McCarthy was appointed first team coach under team manager Warren Feeney at Newport County, replacing Mike Flynn. Feeney and his assistant manager Andy Todd were sacked by Newport on 28 September 2016; McCarthy was appointed joint caretaker manager with Newport's goalkeeping player/coach James Bittner. After Graham Westley was appointed team manager effective from 10 October 2016 (with Dino Maamria his assistant manager), McCarthy was released by the club.

Managerial statistics

References

Living people
1967 births
Association football forwards
Association football defenders
Footballers from Bridgend
Welsh footballers
Welsh football managers
Bridgend Town A.F.C. players
Swansea City A.F.C. players
Plymouth Argyle F.C. players
Bradford City A.F.C. players
Oldham Athletic A.F.C. players
Bristol City F.C. players
Exeter City F.C. players
Taunton Town F.C. players
Newport County A.F.C. managers
English Football League players
Premier League players
Ipswich Town F.C. non-playing staff
Plymouth Argyle F.C. non-playing staff
Newport County A.F.C. non-playing staff
Truro City F.C. managers